"Goodbye Priscilla (Bye Bye Baby Blue)" is a song written   by Deanna Summers, David Saxton and Ben Shaw. It was published by Silicon Music, BMI in 1977 and first recorded by Gene Summers that same year. The song was initially released by Tear Drop Records as a one-sided, promotional, single and later re-issued with "World Of Illusion" as the flip side (#TD 3405).

"Goodbye Priscilla" was written as a tribute to Elvis and Priscilla Presley. The "Goodbye Priscilla" 45 is now a much-sought-after collectible and has been issued on several Elvis "tribute" compilation albums and CDs. When "Goodbye Priscilla (Bye Bye Baby Blue)" was first released there was a controversy about which Priscilla it was written for: Priscilla Presley, or Priscilla Davis, wife of T. Cullen Davis and central figure in the T. Cullen Davis murder trials. In his book Blood Will Tell: The Murder Trials Of Cullen Davis author Gary Cartwright credited the song (page 199) as referring to Priscilla Davis.

References

Discography references
Gene Summers discography from Rockin' Country Style, United States
Gene Summers discography from Rocky Productions, France
Gene Summers discography from Wangdangdula Finland
Gene Summers session data from Tapio's Fin-A-Billy, Finland

Sources
"Blood Will Tell: The Murder Trials Of T. Cullen Davis" by Gary Cartwright (published by Pocket Books USA 1978/1980)
Liner notes "The Ultimate School Of Rock & Roll" 1997 United States
Article and sessionography in issue 15 (1977) of New Kommotion Magazine UK
Article and sessionography in issue 23 (1980) of New Kommotion Magazine UK
Feature article and sessionography in issue 74 (1999) of Rockin' 1950s Magazine Germany
Feature article with photo spread in issue 53 (2000) of Bill Griggs' Rockin' 1950s Magazine United States
Feature Article with photo spread in issue 54 (2000) of Bill Griggs' Rockin' 1950s Magazine United States

1977 singles
Gene Summers songs
1977 songs